Eva T. H. Brann (born 1929) is a former dean (1990–1997) and the longest-serving tutor (1957–present) at St. John's College, Annapolis. She is a 2005 recipient of the National Humanities Medal.

Brann was born to a Jewish family in Berlin.  She immigrated in 1941 to the United States and received her B.A. from Brooklyn College in 1950, her M.A. in Classics from Yale University in 1951, and her Ph.D. in Archaeology from Yale in 1956. She also holds an Honorary Doctorate from Middlebury College.

In her early years at St. John's, she was very close to Jacob Klein. After Klein died, Brann increasingly assumed his role as the defining figure of St. John's, the St. John's program, and the continuing dialogue with the Great Books represented by the program.

Bibliography
Selected published works
Late Geometric and Protoattic Pottery, Mid 8th to Late 7th Century B.C.: Results of excavations conducted by the American school of classical studies at Athens (1962)
 Abraham Lincoln, The Gettysburg Address, and American Constitutionalism by Leo Paul S. de Alvarez, ed. (Berns, Laurence; Thurow, Glen E.; Brann, Eva; Anastaplo, George; contributors)  (1976)
Paradoxes of Education in a Republic (1979)
The World of the Imagination (1992)
Philosophical Imagination and Cultural Memory: Appropriating Historical Traditions by Patricia Cook (Editor), George Allan (Contributor), Donald PhillipVerene (Contributor), Alasdair MacIntyre (Contributor), J. B.Schneewind (Contributor), Lynn S.Joy (Contributor), Robert CummingsNeville (Contributor), Eva T. H.Brann (Contributor), George Kline (Contributor), John S.Rickard (Contributor), Stanley Rosen (Contributor)
The Past-Present: Selected Writings of Eva Brann (1997)
The Study of Time: Philosophical Truth and Human Consequences (Kritikos Professorship in the Humanities, 1999.)
What, Then, Is Time? (1999)
Introduction to His Monkey Wife or Married to a Chimp by John Collier (2000)
The Ways of Naysaying: No, Not, Nothing, and Nonbeing (2001)
Homeric Moments:  Clues to Delight in Reading the Odyssey and the Iliad (2002)
The Music of the Republic: Essays on Socrates' Conversations and Plato's Writings (2004)
Open Secrets/Inward Prospects: Reflections on Word and Soul (2004)
Feeling Our Feelings: What Philosophers Think and People Know (2008)
Homage to Americans: Mile-High Meditations, Close Readings, and Time-Spanning Speculations (2010)
The Logos of Heraclitus (2011)
Un-Willing: An Inquiry into the Rise of Will's Power and an Attempt to Undo It (2014)
Then & Now: The World's Center and the Soul's Demesne (2015) 

Translations
Klein, Jacob, Greek mathematical thought and the origin of algebra. [Die griechische Logistik und die Entstehung der Algebra], 1968
Plato's Sophist or the Professor of Wisdom, 1996
Plato's Phaedo: with Peter Kalkavage and Eric Salem, with translation, introduction and glossary, 1998
Plato's Statesman: with Peter Kalkavage and Eric Salem, with translation, introduction and glossary, 2012
Plato's Symposium or Drinking Party: with Peter Kalkavage and Eric Salem, with translation, introduction and glossary, 2017

References

1929 births
Living people
People from Berlin
Jewish emigrants from Nazi Germany to the United States
Brooklyn College alumni
St. John's College (Annapolis/Santa Fe) faculty
National Humanities Medal recipients
American translators
American women writers
American women academics
20th-century American women
21st-century American women